Dardan is an Albanian masculine given name, derived from the Dardani, an Illyrian tribe who lived in the Balkans. Their name may derive from an Illyrian word meaning "pear" (modern Albanian: "dardha"). The name may refer to:

Dardan Aliu (born 1993), Kosovar Albanian DJ
Dardan Berisha (born 1988), Kosovar-Polish basketball player
Dardan Çerkini (born 1991), Kosovar Albanian football defender
Dardan Dehari (born 1990), Macedonian-Albanian alpine ski racer
Dardan Dreshaj (born 1992), Norwegian football striker
Dardan Gashi (born 1969), Kosovar Albanian politician and author
Dardan Karimani (born 1998), Kosovar Albanian football midfielder
Dardan Molliqaj (born 1985), Kosovar Albanian politician
Dardan Mushkolaj (born 1997), German-Albanian rapper
Dardan Mustafa (born 1992), German-born Swedish footballer
Dardan Rexhepi (born 1992), Kosovar Albanian footballer
Dardan Sejdiu (born 1979), Kosovar Albanian politician
Dardan Selimaj (born 1984), Kosovar Albanian journalist, producer and music theorist
Dardan Vuthaj (born 1995), Albanian football goalkeeper

References

Albanian masculine given names